Kim Ji-eun (Korean: 김지은; born October 9, 1993) is a South Korean actress. She is best known for her roles in television series The Veil (2021), Again My Life (2022), and One Dollar Lawyer (2022).

Career

Career beginnings
Kim Ji-eun officially began to work in the entertainment industry as a commercial model for Bacchus-F (2016). In order to attract the attention of actors management agencies, Kim participated in some music videos filming, worked as crew member, and did independent auditions.

2019–present: Mainstream debut and rising popularity 
Kim's first casting after she signed to her current agency HB Entertainment, was a 2019 film Long Live the King. In the same year, she played her first major role in OCN's crime suspense series Hell Is Other People. 

In 2021, Kim gained recognition with her role as a NIS agent who joined the bureau due to a personal agenda in MBC's espionage thriller The Veil.

Shortly after The Veil, Kim was cast as a female lead for the first time in the 2022 SBS action fantasy Again My Life, as the only daughter of a conglomerate who got embroiled in the battle of succession. In the same year she portrays a legal trainee originated from prestigious family of law practitioners with another series from SBS, a legal comedy One Dollar Lawyer.

Filmography

Film

Television series

Web series

Web shows

Music video appearances

Awards and nominations

References

External links 

 at HB Entertainment
  

1993 births
Living people
South Korean television actresses
South Korean film actresses
21st-century South Korean actresses
Cheongju University alumni
People from Incheon